Sarus (also Romanized as Sārūs) is a village in Panjak-e Rastaq Rural District, Kojur District, Nowshahr County, Mazandaran Province, Iran. At the 2006 census, its population was 19, in 5 families.

References 

Populated places in Nowshahr County